The 2008 CONCACAF Under-17 Women's Championship was the first tournament of this type in Concacaf the tournament was held in Trinidad and Tobago from July 17–27, 2008. The first, second and third placed teams qualified for the 2008 FIFA U-17 Women's World Cup held in New Zealand.

Qualified teams

Group stage
All times are local (UTC−06:00).

Group A

Group B

Knockout stage
All times are local (UTC−06:00).

The winners of the two semifinal matches and the winner of the third place match qualified for the 2008 FIFA U-17 Women's World Cup, held in New Zealand.

Semi-finals

Third place

Final

Winners

Goalscorers
The top-scorer award was shared between Katherine Alvarado (Costa Rica), Tiffany Cameron (Canada) and Courtney Verloo (USA) with five goals each.

References

External links
 Official Site
 

2008
Women's
2008
CON
2008 in Trinidad and Tobago football
2008 in Puerto Rican football
2008 in American women's soccer
2008 in Canadian women's soccer
2008–09 in Mexican football
2008–09 in Salvadoran football
2008–09 in Costa Rican football
2008–09 in Jamaican football
2008 in youth sport
2008 in youth association football